Cosmic Consciousness: A Study in the Evolution of the Human Mind is a 1901 book by the psychiatrist Richard Maurice Bucke, in which the author explores the concept of cosmic consciousness, which he defines as "a higher form of consciousness than that possessed by the ordinary man".

Forms of consciousness
In  Cosmic Consciousness, Bucke stated that he discerned three forms, or degrees,  of consciousness:

Simple consciousness, possessed by both animals and mankind
Self-consciousness, possessed by mankind, encompassing thought, reason, and imagination
Cosmic consciousness, which is "a higher form of consciousness than that possessed by the ordinary man"  

According to Bucke,

Moores said that Bucke's cosmic consciousness is an interconnected way of seeing things "which is more of an intuitive knowing than it is a factual understanding". Moores pointed out that, for scholars of the purist camp, the experience of cosmic consciousness is incomplete without the element of love, "which is the foundation of mystical consciousness".

Juan A. Herrero Brasas said that Bucke's cosmic consciousness refers to the evolution of the intellect, and not to "the ineffable revelation of hidden truths". According to Brasas, it was William James who equated Bucke's cosmic consciousness with mystical experience or mystical consciousness. Gary Lachman notes that today Bucke's experience would most likely be "explained" by the so-called "God spot", or more generally as a case of temporal lobe epilepsy, but he is skeptical of these and other "organic" explanations.

Bucke identified only male examples of cosmic consciousness. He believed that women were not likely to have it. (However, there are some women amongst the "additional cases" listed in the second half of the book.)

He regarded Walt Whitman as "the climax of religious evolution and the harbinger of humanity's future".

Similar concepts

William James

According to Michael Robertson, Cosmic Consciousness and William James's 1902 book The Varieties of Religious Experience have much in common:

James popularized the concept of religious experience, which he explored in  The Varieties of Religious Experience. He saw mysticism as a distinctive experience which supplies knowledge of the transcendental. He considered the "personal religion" to be "more fundamental than either theology or ecclesiasticism", and states:

Regarding cosmic consciousness, William James, in his essay The Confidences of a "Psychical Researcher", wrote:

Collective consciousness

James understood "cosmic consciousness" to be a collective consciousness, a "larger reservoir of consciousness", which manifests itself in the minds of men and remains intact after the dissolution of the individual. It  may "retain traces of the life history of its individual emanation".

Friedrich Schleiermacher
A classification similar to that proposed by Bucke was used by the influential theologian Friedrich Schleiermacher (1768–1834), viz.:

 Animal, brutish self-awareness
 Sensual consciousness
 Higher self-consciousness

In Schleiermacher's theology, higher consciousness "is the part of the human being that is capable of transcending animal instincts". It is the "point of contact with God" and the essence of being human.

When higher consciousness is present, people are not alienated from God by their instincts. The relation between higher and lower consciousness is akin to St. Paul's "struggle of the spirit to overcome the flesh". Higher consciousness establishes a distinction between the natural and the spiritual sides of human beings.

The concept of religious experience was used by Schleiermacher and by Albert Ritschl to defend religion against scientific and secular criticism and to defend the belief that moral and religious experiences justify religious beliefs.

Other writers
Cosmic consciousness bears similarity to Hegel's Geist:

In 1913, Alexander J. McIvor-Tyndall authored Cosmic Consciousness: The Man-God Whom We Await.

Teilhard de Chardin's concept of the noösphere also bears similarity to Bucke's ideas.

According to Paul Marshall, a philosopher of religion, cosmic consciousness bears resemblances to some traditional pantheist beliefs.

According to Ervin László, cosmic consciousness corresponds to Jean Gebser's integral consciousness and to Don Edward Beck and Christopher Cowan's turquoise state of cosmic spirituality.

Ken Wilber, integral philosopher and mystic, identifies four state/stages of cosmic consciousness (mystical experience) above both Gebser's integral level and Beck and Cowan's turquoise level.

Paramahansa Yogananda wrote extensively about Cosmic Consciousness in the Self Realization Fellowship Lessons.

See also

Concepts
 Collective unconscious
 Higher consciousness
 Omega point
 Peak experience
 Religious experience
 Spiritual enlightenment
 Spiritual evolution

Models
 Axial Age
 Fowler's stages of faith development
 Great chain of being
 Spiral Dynamics

Persons
 Alan Watts
 Aurobindo
 Carl Jung
 Jean Gebser
 Ken Wilber

Movements
 New Age
 New Thought
 Theosophy
 Transcendentalism
 Transpersonal psychology

Related topics
 Materialism
 Mysticism
 Nondualism
 Panpsychism
 Physicalism
 Spirituality

References

Notes

Bibliography

External links
 [http://www.sacred-texts.com/eso/cc/index.htm Richard M. Bucke, Cosmic Consciousness]
 Paglia, Camille. (Winter 2003). Cults and Cosmic Consciousness: Religious Vision in the American 1960s.  Arion''. 10 (3), 57–111.
 Citations of the masters : Cosmic consciousness
 Cosmic Tome : Universal Cosmogony and Cosmic Consciousness
 Relative Modality : A new map of the evolution of mind toward Cosmic Consciousness

1901 non-fiction books
Books about consciousness
English-language books
Epistemology of religion
Literature about spirituality
Metaphysics of religion
Mysticism
New Age books
Subjective experience